Fosheeton also (Fasheeton) is an unincorporated community in Tallapoosa County, Alabama, United States.

Notes

Unincorporated communities in Tallapoosa County, Alabama
Unincorporated communities in Alabama